Kids News Network, created 1991 in New York City by JoAnna Levenglick who also produced the show featuring junior reporters. The Kids News Network covered entertainment, pro sports, books, technology, style, and health. Celebrity interviews are one-on-one, and are done by two young reporters, including Diandra Levenglick, who had done celebrity interviews since 1993, and have traveled all over the United States, Canada and the Bahamas doing movie junkets and were on the set of feature films. Some of the guests include: Arnold Swarzeneggar, Al Jareau, George Benson, Lindsay Lohan, Sinbad, Martin Short, Rosie O'Donnell, Oprah, Shaq, Phil Hartman, Natalie Portman, Richie Sambora, Tina Fey, the Olsen Twins, Derek Jeter, Kobe Bryant, Samuel L. Jackson, Morgan Freeman. The Kids News Network was the first TV news and entertainment show that featured so many celebrities and famous authors of children's books and pro sports players. The show is in the process of going Broadband.

External links
Official site

1991 American television series debuts
1990s American television news shows
2000s American television news shows
2010s American television news shows
2020s American television news shows